Mallie's Sports Grill & Bar is a restaurant, sports grill, and bar located in Southgate, Michigan. It was established in 2005. It is best known for setting the world record of the biggest hamburger commercially available.

World's biggest hamburger commercially available
Mallie's Sports Bar and Grill sells the world's largest, commercially available hamburger, weighing approximately 338.6 pounds.
The restaurant advises that customers call at least 72 hours in advance, at a cost of $1,999 served in house or to go for an additional $200.

Man v. Food
Mallie's was featured on Man v. Food during a Detroit area visit from Adam Richman, the host of the show; he and a team of 40 people attempted to eat a 190-pound "Absolutely Ridiculous Burger" within two hours, but only managed to eat 160 pounds when time ran out. This episode aired on November 4, 2009.

Modern Marvels
An almost 250 pound "Absolutely Ridiculous Burger" was served to a football team during the Modern Marvels episode "Supersized Food" that originally aired on November 5, 2010.  The burger took over twelve hours to cook and another approximately eight hours to cool.  They also showed how the bun was made at the bakery down the street along with all the steps of its creation.

See also

 List of hamburger restaurants

References

External links
Mallie's Sports Grill & Bar website

Restaurants in Michigan
Hamburger restaurants
Restaurants established in 2005
Southgate, Michigan
2005 establishments in Michigan